Thomas Lewis Mackesy FRCSI (1790 – 8 April 1869) was an Irish doctor and politician who was Mayor of Waterford, and the first President of the Royal College of Surgeons in Ireland (1862) from outside Dublin.

Life
Mackesy was born in Waterford, Ireland, the son of an apothecary. After some involvement in the Battle of Waterloo, he went on to train in Dublin for the office of assistant-surgeon in the army.

He spent seven years abroad with the army before returning to Waterford where he was appointed Surgeon to the Leper and Fanning Hospitals in Waterford and took an interest in the public life of his native city. He married Mary Poulter.   

He was elected Mayor of Waterford in 1841 having served on Waterford Corporation.

His son Joseph Poulter Mackesy (1816 - 1866) followed in his father's footsteps and became a Fellow of the Royal College of Surgeons in Ireland and an Alderman of Waterford Corporation.

Arms

References

Fellows of the Royal College of Surgeons in Ireland
Politicians from County Waterford
Irish general practitioners
1790 births
1869 deaths
Presidents of the Royal College of Surgeons in Ireland